Emily Ann Thompson (born 1962) is an American aural historian.
She teaches at Princeton University.

She graduated from the Rochester Institute of Technology with a B.S. in Physics in 1984, and from Princeton University, with a Ph.D. in the history of science in 1992.
She was Associate Professor of History at University of California, San Diego, from 2005 to 2006.

Awards
 2005 MacArthur Fellows Program
 2005 Edelstein Prize sponsored by the Society for the History of Technology (SHOT)
 2004 Marc-August Pictet Prize presented by The Societe de Physique et d'Histoire Naturelle (SPHN) de Geneve
 2003 John Hope Franklin Book Award presented by the American Studies Association
 2002 Science Writing Award in Acoustics for Journalists, presented by the Acoustical Society of America 
 2003 Lewis Mumford Award for Outstanding Scholarship in the Ecology of Technics

Works
The Soundscape of Modernity: Architectural Acoustics and the Culture of Listening in America, 1900-1933, MIT Press, 2002, 
The Architecture of Science, Peter Galison, Emily Thompson (Eds.) MIT Press, 1999,

References

External links
"Interview with MacArthur "Genius" Winner Emily Thompson", History News Network, Jamie Rodriguez, 1-23-06

1962 births
Living people
21st-century American historians
Rochester Institute of Technology alumni
Princeton University alumni
Princeton University faculty
MacArthur Fellows
American women historians
21st-century American women